Frank H. Luce (May 23, 1859 – February 1, 1937) was a Republican politician from the U.S. state of Washington. He served as the second Lieutenant Governor of Washington after serving the state senate.

He died in Seattle in 1937.

References

Lieutenant Governors of Washington (state)
1859 births
1937 deaths